Sunset Terrace Historic District is a national historic district located at Asheville, Buncombe County, North Carolina.  The district encompasses nine contributing buildings in a residential section of Asheville. The property was developed after 1913, and includes representative examples of Tudor Revival and Bungalow style dwellings. Notable dwellings include the Rosemary Cottage (1913), Primrose Cottage (1913), Rambler Cottage (1915), Westview Cottage (1915), and Violet Cottage (1920).

It was listed on the National Register of Historic Places in 2005.

Gallery

References

Houses on the National Register of Historic Places in North Carolina
Historic districts on the National Register of Historic Places in North Carolina
Tudor Revival architecture in North Carolina
Houses in Asheville, North Carolina
National Register of Historic Places in Buncombe County, North Carolina